Anting is a station on the branch line of Line 11 of the Shanghai Metro, located in the town of Anting in Jiading District. It is the last station in Shanghai on the branch line of Line 11 before entering Kunshan, Jiangsu. It served as the terminus of the line until the extension to Huaqiao in Jiangsu province on 16 October 2013.

References 
 

Railway stations in Shanghai
Line 11, Shanghai Metro
Shanghai Metro stations in Jiading District
Railway stations in China opened in 2010